Events from the year 1896 in Ireland.

Events
February – the Broighter Gold hoard of prehistoric objects is discovered near Limavady by Tom Nicholl while ploughing.
16 May – the first electric tram runs on the Dublin tramways system.
May – James Connolly returns from Edinburgh to Ireland as paid organiser for the Dublin Socialist Club. He founds the Irish Republican Socialist Party.
28 March – Tom Gallaher incorporates the Gallaher tobacco business and opens the world's largest tobacco factory in Belfast.
 John Dillon assumes the leadership of the anti-Parnellite wing of the Home Rule Party.
 An extension is made to Arthur Balfour's Land Act. 1,500 bankrupt estates are made available for sale to tenants.
 Ireland's first motor vehicle laws are introduced.
 Restoration of the Church of Ireland's Kildare Cathedral is completed.

Arts and literature
20 April – first cinema show in Ireland, at Dan Lowry's Star of Erin Variety Theatre in Dublin.
The lyrics of The Mountains of Mourne are written by Percy French with Dr. W. Houston Collision.
Charles Villiers Stanford's comic opera Shamus O'Brien is first performed.

Sport

Cricket
International
February: Tim O'Brien becomes the first Irish captain of the England cricket team in a match won against South Africa at Port Elizabeth

Football
International
29 February  Wales 6–1 Ireland (in Wrexham)
7 March  Ireland 0-2 England (in Belfast)
28 March  Ireland 3-3 Scotland (in Belfast)
Irish League
Winners: Distillery
Irish Cup
Winners: Distillery 3 - 1 Glentoran

Field hockey
International
2 March: The Ireland women's national field hockey team defeat England 2–0 at Alexandra College in the first ever women's international field hockey match.

Tennis
The Championships, Wimbledon
Harold Mahony wins the gentleman's singles Championship
Olympic Games
John Pius Boland wins gold medals in the men's singles and doubles at the first modern Summer Olympics in Athens (Greece)

Births
15 February – Arthur Shields, actor (died 1970).
March – Martin Joseph Sheehan, soldier and Royal Air Service Observer in World War I, killed in action (died 1918).
4 April – Sir Osmond Esmonde, 12th Baronet, diplomat and politician (died 1936).
24 April – F. R. Higgins, poet and theatre director (died 1941).
9 May – Austin Clarke, poet, playwright and writer (died 1974).
22 May – Cyril Fagan, astrologer (died 1970).
28 August – Liam O'Flaherty, novelist and short story writer (died 1984).
10 November – Sophie Catherine Theresa Mary Peirce-Evans, later Mary, Lady Heath, aviator, athlete and writer (died 1939).
25 December – Sister Philippa Brazill, nurse in Australia (died 1988).
Full date unknown
Monk Gibbon, poet and author (died 1987).
Fiona Plunkett, republican (died 1977).

Deaths
10 January – Denis Dempsey, soldier, recipient of the Victoria Cross (born 1826).
3 February – Jane Wilde, poet ("Esperanza"; born 1821).
4 March – Peter Richard Kenrick, first Catholic archbishop west of the Mississippi River (born 1806).
4 May – Timothy Anglin, politician in Canada and Speaker of the House of Commons of Canada (born 1822).
18 May – Patrick Buckley, soldier, lawyer, statesman, and judge in New Zealand (born 1841).
8 August – William Pery, 3rd Earl of Limerick, peer (born 1840).
10 August – Jeremiah O'Sullivan, Roman Catholic Bishop of Mobile (born 1842).
15 August – Patrick Duggan, Roman Catholic Bishop of Clonfert (born 1813).
22 September – Edward Selby Smyth, British General, commanded Militia of Canada from 1874 to 1880 (born 1819).
1 November – Jack (Nonpareil) Dempsey, boxer (born 1862).
31 December – Leland Hone, cricketer (born 1853).
Full date unknown
Canon James Goodman, Irish music collector (born 1828).

References

 
1890s in Ireland
Ireland
Years of the 19th century in Ireland
Ireland